Michael Trummer (born 31 May 1962 in Zeitz) is a German slalom canoeist who competed from the late 1980s to late 1990s. He won three bronze medals at the ICF Canoe Slalom World Championships in the C2 team event (1991, 1995, 1997). He also won a gold medal in the same event at the 1996 European Championships.

Competing in two Summer Olympics, he earned his best finish of fourth in the C2 event in Atlanta in 1996.

His partner in the boat throughout the whole of active his career was Manfred Berro.

World Cup individual podiums

References
Sports-Reference.com profile

1962 births
Canoeists at the 1992 Summer Olympics
Canoeists at the 1996 Summer Olympics
German male canoeists
Living people
Olympic canoeists of Germany
Medalists at the ICF Canoe Slalom World Championships
People from Zeitz
Sportspeople from Saxony-Anhalt